The Piaggio P.111 was an Italian high-altitude research aircraft designed and built by Piaggio for the Regia Aeronautica (Italian Royal Air Force).

Design and development
The genesis of the P.111 was in 1938, when the Regia Aeronautica awarded a contract to Piaggio to construct the prototype of a three-seat, twin-engine, high-speed, high-altitude bomber with a pressurized cabin. Piaggio constructed a new radial engine especially for the P.111, the  18-cylinder double-row air-cooled Piaggio P.XII R.C.l00/2v, which was fitted with a two-stage supercharger.

While the P.111 prototype was under construction, the Regia Aeronatica decided to use it as a high-altitude research aircraft rather than a bomber prototype.

Operational history
The P.111 first flew on 9 April 1941. Employed in research related to pressurization of the cabin of the Piaggio P.108 heavy bomber, it made 110 test and research flights before being retired and scrapped early in 1943.

Operators

Regia Aeronautica

Specifications

See also

References

External links

AR Aircraft Manuals Blueprints Video Publications: Piaggio P.111

P.111
1940s Italian experimental aircraft
Aircraft first flown in 1941
Twin-engined piston aircraft